Dirk J. Debbink is a retired vice admiral in the United States Navy and former Chief of the Navy Reserve.

Early life and education
From Oconomowoc, Wisconsin, Debbink holds a bachelor's degree from the United States Naval Academy and a Master of Business Administration from the University of Chicago Booth School of Business. He is also a registered professional engineer in Wisconsin.

Naval career
He was named Deputy Chief of the Navy Reserve in 2007 before being named Chief of Navy Reserve the next year.

Awards Debbink has received include the Defense Superior Service Medal, Legion of Merit with award star, the Defense Meritorious Service Medal, the Meritorious Service Medal with award star, the Navy and Marine Corps Commendation Medal with award star, and the Navy Achievement Medal.

References

People from Oconomowoc, Wisconsin
Military personnel from Wisconsin
United States Navy vice admirals
Recipients of the Legion of Merit
United States Naval Academy alumni
University of Chicago Booth School of Business alumni
Living people
Recipients of the Defense Superior Service Medal
Year of birth missing (living people)